Oudh Narayan Shrivastava (born April 1935) is an Indian former officer of the Indian Police Service who served as the Governor of Nagaland and later the Governor of Manipur. He was awarded the Padma Shri in 1992.

Career
Oudh Narayan Shrivastava served with the Indian Police Service for 35 years, including 20 years with the Intelligence Bureau. He spent the last eighteen years in the Northeastern states, after which he was appointed Governor of Manipur and Nagaland, from where he eventually retired.

Shrivastava was directly responsible for the peace accords with the Mizo National Front, Tripura National Volunteers and the All Bodo Students’ Union.

Shrivastava has been decorated many times by the IPS and IB and was awarded the Padma Shri in 1992, for outstanding work in the Northeast.

After retirement he took to writing. He has published five anthologies of short and long stories, of which four are in Hindi and one in English, and continues to write.

Bibliography
 Life And Times Of Dacoit Queen Putli Bai (and Some Short Stories), 1990
 Slave Boy and other stories & Shubho Srishti and other stories, 2017

References

1935 births
Living people
Indian police officers
Governors of Manipur
Governors of Nagaland
Recipients of the Padma Shri in civil service